Tufan may refer to:

 Tufan (name), a masculine Turkish given name and surname
 Tibet, called Tufan or Tubo in Chinese historical texts
 The Tibetan Empire (618–842)
 Tufan, Iran, a village in Razavi Khorasan Province